The Hollywood Congress of Republicans (HCR) is a chapter of the California Congress of Republicans, itself a permanently chartered organization of the California Republican Party. Founded in 2001, the group's members are conservatives who work in the film industry in Hollywood.

See also
 Friends of Abe
 Motion Picture Alliance for the Preservation of American Ideals

External links
 Home page

2001 establishments in the United States
Republican Party (United States) organizations
Organizations established in 2001